Civil Lines is a neighbourhood locality in Rawalpindi, Punjab. It was built by the British Raj for the civil officers.

References

External links 
 Civil Lines on the Google Maps

Populated places in Rawalpindi Cantonment